Active Body Control, or ABC, is the Mercedes-Benz brand name used to describe electronically controlled hydropneumatic suspension. 

This suspension combines a high level of ride quality with control of the vehicle body motions, and therefore virtually eliminates body roll in many driving situations including cornering, accelerating, and braking.  

Mercedes-Benz has been experimenting with these capabilities for automobile suspension since the air suspension of the 1963 600 and the hydropneumatic (fluid and air) suspension of the 1974 6.9. 

ABC was only offered on rear-wheel drive models, as all-wheel drive 4MATIC models were available only with Airmatic semi-active air suspension, with the 2019 Mercedes-Benz GLE 450 4MATIC being the first AWD to have ABC available. 

The production version was introduced at the 1999 Geneva Motor Show  on the new Mercedes-Benz CL-Class C215.

Description 
In the ABC system, a computer detects body movement from sensors located throughout the vehicle, and controls the action of the active suspension with the use of hydraulic servomechanisms. The hydraulic pressure to the servos is supplied by a high pressure radial piston hydraulic pump, operating at 3,000psi. Accumulators regulate the hydraulic pressure, by means of an enclosed nitrogen bubble separated from the hydraulic fluid by a membrane. 

A total of 13 sensors continually monitor body movement and vehicle level and supply the ABC controller with new data every ten milliseconds.  Four level sensors, one at each wheel measure the ride level of the vehicle, three accelerometers measure the vertical body acceleration, one acceleration sensor measures the longitudinal and one sensor the transverse body acceleration. As the ABC controller receives and processes data, it operates four hydraulic servos, each mounted on an air and pressurized hydraulic fluid strut, beside each wheel.

Almost instantaneously, the servo regulated suspension generates counter forces to body lean, dive and squat during various driving maneuvers. A suspension strut, consisting of a steel coil spring and a  shock absorber connected in parallel, as well as a hydraulically controlled adjusting cylinder, are located between the vehicle body and wheel. These components adjust the cylinder in the direction of the suspension strut, and change the suspension length.  This creates a force which acts on the suspension and dampening of the vehicle in the frequency range up to five hertz. 

The ABC system also allows self-levelling suspension, which raises or lowers the vehicle in response to changing load (i.e. the loading or unloading of passengers or cargo).  Each vehicle equipped with ABC has an “ABC Sport” button that allows the driver to adjust the suspension range for different driving style preferences. This feature allows the driver to adjust the suspension to maintain a more level ride in more demanding driving conditions.

The reliable function of the ABC system requires a regular hydraulic oil change and filter replacement.

The Mercedes-Benz C112 of 1991, Mercedes-Benz Vario Research Car of 1995 and the Mercedes-Benz F200 of 1996 already featured  prototype versions of ABC.

The first complete and ready-for-production version of ABC was introduced in 1999 on the top-of-the-line Mercedes-Benz CL-Class (C215).

In 2006, the Mercedes-Benz CL-Class (C216) introduced the second generation Active Body Control suspension, referred to as ABC Plus or ABC II in technical documentation. This updated suspension reduced body roll by 45% compared to the first generation ABC suspension. ABC Plus had an updated hydraulic system design, with shorter hydraulic lines, and the pulsation damper was relocated to be mounted directly on the tandem pump.

In 2010 a crosswind stabilization function was introduced. In strong gusts of crosswind, and depending on the direction and intensity of the wind having an effect on the vehicle, this system varies the wheel load distribution in such a way that the effects of winds are largely compensated or reduced to a minimum. For this purpose the ABC control unit uses the yaw rate, lateral acceleration, steering angle and road speed sensors of the Electronic Stability Program ESP®.

Magic Body Control

In 2007, the Mercedes-Benz F700 concept introduced the PRE-SCAN suspension, an early prototype road scanning suspension, using lidar sensors, based on Active Body Control.

In 2013 the Mercedes-Benz S-Class (W222) introduced the series production version of PRE-SCAN, but with a stereo camera instead of laser projectors. The system dubbed Magic Body Control is fitted with a road-sensing system (Road Surface Scan) that pre-loads the shocks for the road surface detected. Initially only available on 8-cylinder models and above, Magic Ride Control attempts to isolate the car's body by predicting rather than reacting to broken pavement and speed humps. The ABC has undergone major modifications for the new S-Class: the wheel damping is now continuously adjustable, the spring strut response has been improved and the pump efficiency has been further enhanced. A digital interface connects the control unit and the sensors, while the fast FlexRay bus connects the control unit and the vehicle electronics. Processing power is more than double that of the previous system.

In 2014 the new C217 S-Class Coupe introduced an update to Magic Body Control, called Active Curve  Tilting. This new system allows the vehicle to lean up to 2.5 degrees into a turn, similar to a tilting train. The leaning is intended to counter the effect of centrifugal force on the occupants and is available only on rear-wheel drive models

Vehicles 
Vehicles, chronological order:
Mercedes-Benz C112
Mercedes-Benz Vario Research Car
Mercedes-Benz F200
Mercedes-Benz CL-Class C215
Mercedes-Benz S-Class (W220), standard on S600 and S55 AMG, optional on other trims
Mercedes-Benz SL Class R230
Mercedes-Benz S-Class (W221)
Mercedes-Benz CL-Class (C216)
Mercedes-Benz SL Class R231
Mercedes-Benz S-Class (W222): Magic Body Control
Mercedes-Benz S-Class (C217): Magic Body Control

Timeline of active suspension development
1955 Citroën DS had hydropneumatic suspension designed by Paul Magès - the first car with height adjustable suspension and self-levelling suspension; leveraging the fact that gas/air absorbs force, while fluid transfers force smoothly
1962 Mercedes-Benz W112 platform featured an air suspension on the 300SE model and the 1963 Mercedes-Benz 600 model
1965 Rolls-Royce Silver Shadow licensed technology from the Citroën DS: hydropneumatic suspension offering self-levelling 
1974 Maserati Quattroporte II used the height adjustable suspension and self-levelling suspension from the Citroën SM
1975 Mercedes-Benz 450SEL 6.9 with fully Hydropneumatic suspension similar in technology, but not geometry, to Citroën design
1979 Mercedes-Benz W126 then new S class had even more sophisticated height adjustable suspension and self-levelling suspension.
1984 Mercedes-Benz W124 selected models of E class had this technology (rear only hydraulic suspension) height adjustable suspension and self-levelling suspension.
1985 Bose Corporation founder and CEO Dr. Amar Bose Designed a suspension that mixed passenger comfort and vehicle control, this system used linear electromagnetic motors, power amplifiers, control algorithms and computation speed.
Early-1980s through early '90s, Lotus Engineering, the consultant branch of Lotus Cars, experimented with active suspension layouts, combining Electrohydraulic servo valve technology from aerospace, a variety of sensors and both analog and digital controllers.  About 100 prototype cars and trucks (and several racing cars) were built for a wide variety of customers, with variants of the high bandwidth Lotus Active system. 
1986-Lotus Engineering and Moog Inc. formed joint venture Moog-Lotus Systems Inc. to commercialize the Lotus technology with electro-hydraulic servo valves designed by Moog.  The joint venture was later purchased by the TRW Steering and Suspension Division.
1989 Citroën XM had a similar electronic control of hydraulic suspension, branded Hydractive.
1989  Toyota Celica with Toyota Active Control Suspension
1991 Infiniti Q45 was optionally equipped with "Full Active Suspension", a world-first in production automobiles.
1991 Toyota Soarer had a fully active hydraulic suspension system on the 1991 UZZ32 model:Toyota Active Control Suspension. 
1994 Citroën Xantia ACTIVA variant introduced active anti-roll bars as an extension to their Hydractive II suspension.
1999 Mercedes-Benz CL-Class C215 introduces Active Body Control.

References

External links
Mercedes-Benz USA
Mercedes-Benz International

 

Mercedes-Benz
Automotive suspension technologies
Automotive technology tradenames
Automotive safety technologies
Auto parts
Mechanical power control